Antistasea is a genus of bristle flies in the family Tachinidae.

Species
 Antistasea fimbriata Bischof, 1904
 Antistasea mutans Mesnil, 1970

References

Exoristinae
Tachinidae genera
Diptera of South America